Siemiradz  (German Neudorf) is a settlement in the administrative district of Gmina Trzebiel, within Żary County, Lubusz Voivodeship, in western Poland, close to the German border.

See also
Territorial changes of Poland after World War II

References

Siemiradz